Penelope, often used in reference to Homer's character, is a female first name of Greek origin. It is of uncertain meaning but may be derived from the Greek word penelops, which means  duck or refers to another water fowl sacred to the Ancient Greeks. The name might also be derived from the Greek pene meaning web and either ops meaning eye or lepo, meaning unraveled, implying the meaning weaver.     The name was revived in the Anglosphere by the mid-16th Century and has since been in occasional use.

Popularity
The name has increased in popularity in recent years. It is among the most popular names for girls in Australia, Canada, England and Wales, Italy, New Zealand, Scotland, and the United States.

People 

 Penelope, Lady Aitken (1910–2005), English socialite
 Penelope Aubin, English novelist
 Penelope Austin, Australian singer-songwriter
 Penelope Blount, Countess of Devonshire (1562–1607), English noblewoman
 Penelope Boston, American speleologist
 Penelope Carwardine, English painter
 Penelope Casas, American food writer
 Penelope Chetwode, English travel writer
 Penelope Coelen, South African beauty pageant contestant
 Penélope Cruz (born 1974), Spanish actress
 Penelope Delta (1874–1941), Greek author
 Penelope Dudley-Ward (1914–1982), English actress
 Penelope Fillon (born 1955), wife of French politician and former Prime Minister of France François Fillon
 Penelope Fitzgerald (1916–2000), Booker Prize-winning English novelist, poet, essayist and biographer
 Penelope Gilliatt (1932–1993), English novelist, short story writer, screenwriter and film critic
 Penelope Jean Hayes, American self-help author
 Penelope Heyns (born 1974), South African swimmer and double gold medalist at the 1996 Olympic Games
 Penelope Houston (born 1958), American singer-songwriter
 Penelope Keith (born 1940), English actress famous for TV sitcoms
 Penelope Lively (born 1933), British fiction writer
 Penelope Ann Miller (born 1964), American actress
 Penelope Mortimer (1918–1999), British journalist, biographer and novelist
 Penelope Mountbatten, Lady Ivar Mountbatten (born 1966), British philanthropist and businesswoman
 Penelope Spheeris (born 1945), American director, producer and screenwriter
 Penelope Stout (17th century), early white settler of Monmouth County, New Jersey
 Penelope Tree (born 1950), Anglo-American former fashion model prominent in swinging sixties London
 Penelope Wensley (born 1946), Governor of Queensland, Australia
 Penelope Wilton (born 1946), English actress

Fictional and mythological characters 
 Penelope, the wife of Odysseus in Homer's Odyssey
 Penelope, mother of the god Pan in Greek mythology
 Penelope, a character in the anime Hamtaro
 Penelope, a major antagonist in the Sly Cooper video game series
 Penelope "Punky" Brewster, the main character in the television sitcom Punky Brewster
 Penelope Alvarez, a character in One Day at a Time
 Penelope Clearwater, a character in the Harry Potter series
 Lady Penelope Creighton-Ward, a character from the 1960s television program Thunderbirds
 Penelope Featherington, a character from the book and TV series Bridgerton
 Penelope Garcia, a character in the television drama Criminal Minds
 Penelope Lang, an antagonist in the animated series Atomic Betty
 Penelope Park, a character in Legacies
 Penelope Pitstop, a Hanna-Barbera cartoon character
 Penelope Pussycat, a character from the Looney Tunes franchise
 Penelope Shafai, a character in Gossip Girl
 Penelope Taynt, a character in The Amanda Show
 Penelope Wilhern, a character in the 2006 film Penelope, portrayed by Christina Ricci
 Penny Widmore, a recurring character on the television show Lost

Notes

See also
Penny (given name)

Feminine given names
Given names of Greek language origin
English feminine given names
Given names derived from birds
Greek feminine given names
br:Penelope (anv)